Liu Jie (17 February 1915 – 23 September 2018) was a Chinese communist politician. From 1960 to the outbreak of the Cultural Revolution he was minister of the Second Ministry of Machine Building which was responsible for the nuclear industry. Subsequently, he was governor of the province of Henan from 1979 to 1981, and CPC Committee Secretary of Henan (1981–1985).

References

1915 births
2018 deaths
Governors of Henan
Chinese Communist Party politicians from Hebei
People's Republic of China politicians from Hebei
Politicians from Xingtai
Members of the Central Advisory Commission
Chinese centenarians
Men centenarians
CCP committee secretaries of Henan